William Zeitler (born 1954 in St. Louis) is a performer on the armonica, or glass harmonica, an instrument invented by Benjamin Franklin. In 2013 he published The Glass Armonica: The Music and the Madness, a book about glass instruments and their history.

Also a composer.

References

External links
Official site

American percussionists
Glass harmonica players
1954 births
Musicians from St. Louis
Living people
Date of birth missing (living people)